The Wild Gutach is a river in Baden-Württemberg, Germany. It flows into the Elz in Gutach im Breisgau.

Sights and structures 
 Hexenlochmühle with two overshot water wheels in a ravine-like witch's hole (Hexenloch)
 Balzer Herrgott, a stone statue of Christ which has almost grown into a tree
 Teichschlucht ravine below Gütenbach
 Hirschbach Falls and Zweribach Waterfalls in the rugged Zweribach Cirque (Bannwald and nature reserve)
 Plattensee Reservoir in the high valley of the Platte of the Zweribach
 Zweribachwerk, power station above Simonswald
 Brend summit
 Kandel summit
 Schultiskopf and Spitzer Stein (rocky arêtes)
 Kostgfällschlucht with waterfalls and the Gfällfelsen rock formation (climbing area, nature reserve)
 Chapel on the Hörnleberg

See also
List of rivers of Baden-Württemberg

References

Rivers of Baden-Württemberg
Rivers of Germany